János Rózsás (6 August 1926  – 2 November 2012) was a Hungarian writer. 

Rózsás was born in Budapest.  He was held captive in the Soviet Union between 1944 and 1953, and it was during this period of internment that he became friends with Aleksandr Solzhenitsyn, the Nobel prize-winning Soviet writer. He wrote several books and articles on the issue of the Gulag.
Zoltan Szalkai, the Hungarian filmmaker, made a film of János Rózsás and György Zoltán Bien, who were eyewitnesses of the gulag.  Rózsás died on November 2, 2012, aged 86, in Nagykanizsa.

Published works
Keserű ifjúság (Bitter Youth) (München, 1986)
Éltető reménység (Vital Trust) (München, 1987)
Duszja nővér (Nurse Duszja) (Nagykanizsa, 1995)
GULAG-lexikon (GULAG-encyclopedia) (Budapest, 2000)
Leventesors (Fate of a young Hungarian military trainee during the Second World War) (Nagykanizsa, 2005)

References

1926 births
2012 deaths
Foreign Gulag detainees
Hungarian writers